The Theatre de la Renaissance was a theater in New Orleans, Louisiana. It opened in 1840, with members of the Negro Philharmonic Orchestra performing, and an entirely black cast and music director. The Theatre's programs included variety shows, plays and other productions, aimed at African American audiences.

See also

List of opera houses

References

Notes

Concert halls in Louisiana
Music venues in Louisiana
Opera houses in Louisiana
Performing arts centers in Louisiana
Theatres in New Orleans
1840 establishments in Louisiana